The Federalist Party, was less of a party in the traditional sense, than a coalition of various independent politicians, conservatives, and ethnic minority parties, dedicated to the Habsburg monarchy, and the federalization of Cis-Leithanian, i.e. Austrian-dominated, part of the Austrian-Hungarian Dual monarchy.

The party was primarily supported by the Church, the German upper class, and ethnic minorities within the Austrian dominated section of the empire, in particular the Polish speaking population. The politics of the Federal party were staunchly Conservative and anti-liberal, in social, economic and political spheres. It sought to preserve the monarchy and the established order through federalization, bringing the Slavs equality relative to their fellow German citizens, constitutionally and socially. Gradually, thanks to failures in efforts towards federalization, and the growing consciousness and nationalism of the Slavs within the Empire, the party began to disintegrate. It was unable to compete for Conservative and Federalist inclined middle and lower class voters, and lost ground to the rising Christian Social Party (Austria). Upon the introduction of General suffrage in 1907, the remains of the Federalist party merged into the Christian Social party, giving it a distinctly more Conservative character.

See also 
 Conservatism in Austria
 National Constitution Party

Notes and references 
 

Political parties established in 1861
Political parties in Austria-Hungary
Defunct political parties in Austria
Political history of Austria
Liberal parties in Austria
1861 establishments in the Austrian Empire
Political parties disestablished in 1907
1907 disestablishments in Austria-Hungary